Sikandar Shah may refer to:

 Sikandar Shah, Sultan of Bengal (1358-1390)
 Sikandar Shah Miri (var. Sikandar Butshikan), Sultan of Kashmir (1389-1413)
 Nuruddin Sikandar Shah, Sultan of Bengal (1481)
 Sikandar Shah, ruler of Gujarat Sultanate (1526)
 Sikandar Shah Suri, Sur dynasty, Shah of Delhi (1555)
 Min Phalaung Sikandar Shah, Mrauk U King of Arakan (1572-1593)